Michael Graves (July 9, 1934 – March 12, 2015) was an American architect, designer, and educator, as well as principal of Michael Graves and Associates and Michael Graves Design Group. He was a member of The New York Five and the Memphis Group – and a professor of architecture at Princeton University for nearly forty years. Following his own partial paralysis in 2003, Graves became an internationally recognized advocate of health care design. 

Graves' global portfolio of architectural work ranged from the Ministry of Culture in The Hague, a post office for Celebration, Florida, a prominent expansion of the Denver Public Library to numerous commissions for Disney – as well as the scaffolding design for the 2000 Washington Monument restoration.  He was recognized as a major influence on architectural movements including New Urbanism, New Classicism and particularly Postmodernism — his buildings in the latter style including the noted Portland Building in Oregon and the Humana Building in Kentucky.

For his architectural work, Graves received a fellowship of the American Institute of Architects as well as its highest award, the AIA Gold Medal (2001).  He was trustee of the American Academy in Rome and was the president of its Society of Fellows from 1980 to 1984.  He received the American Prize for Architecture, the National Medal of Arts (1999) and the Driehaus Architecture Prize (2012). 

Additionally, Graves became popularly well known through his high end as well as mass consumer product designs for companies ranging from Alessi in Italy to Target and J. C. Penney in the United States. The New York Times described Graves as "one of the most prominent and prolific American architects of the latter 20th century, who designed more than 350 buildings around the world but was perhaps best known for [a] teakettle and pepper mill."

Personal life and education
Graves was born on July 9, 1934, in Indianapolis, Indiana, to Erma (Lowe) and Thomas B. Graves. He grew up in the city's suburbs and later credited his mother for suggesting that he become an engineer or an architect. Graves graduated from Indianapolis's Broad Ripple High School in 1950 and earned a bachelor's degree in architecture in 1958 from the University of Cincinnati. During college he also became a member of the Sigma Chi fraternity. Graves earned a master's degree in architecture from Harvard University in 1959.

After graduation from college, Graves spent a year working in George Nelson's office. Nelson, a furniture designer and the creative director for Herman Miller, exposed Graves to the work of fellow designers Charles and Ray Eames and Alexander Girard. In 1960 Graves won the American Academy in Rome's Prix de Rome (Rome Prize) and spent the next two years at the Academy in Italy. Graves describes himself as "transformed" by his experience in Rome:  "I discovered new ways of seeing and analyzing both architecture and landscape."

His marriage to Gail Devine in 1955 ended in divorce; his subsequent marriage to Lucy James in 1972 also ended in divorce. Graves was the father of three children, two sons and a daughter.

Career

Graves began his career in 1962 as a professor of architecture at Princeton University, where he taught for nearly four decades (and later helped to establish the Michael Graves College at Kean University), and established his own architectural firm in 1964 at Princeton, New Jersey. Graves worked as an architect in public practice designing a variety of buildings that included private residences, university buildings, hotel resorts, hospitals, retail and commercial office buildings, museums, civic buildings, and monuments. During a career that spanned nearly fifty years, Graves and his firm designed more than 350 buildings around the world, in addition to an estimated 2,000 household products.

Professor of Architecture
In 1962, after two years of studies in Rome, Graves returned to the United States and moved to Princeton, New Jersey, where he had accepted a professorship at the Princeton University School of Architecture. Graves taught at Princeton for thirty-nine years while simultaneously practicing architecture. He retired as the Robert Schirmer Professor of Architecture, Emeritus, in 2001. Although Graves was a longtime faculty member at Princeton and trained many of its architecture students, the university did not allow its faculty to practice their profession on its campus. As a result, Graves was never commissioned to design a building for the university. Later in his life he contributed to the founding of a new college, which bears his name at Kean University.

Architect
In his early years as an architect, Graves did designs for home renovation projects in Princeton. In 1964 he founded the architectural firm of Michael Graves & Associate in Princeton and remained in public practice there until the end of his life. His firm maintained offices in Princeton, New Jersey, and in New York City, but his residence in Princeton served as his design studio, home office and library, and a place to display the many objects he collected during his world travels. Nicknamed "The Warehouse", it also displayed many of the household items he designed. After Graves's death, Kean University acquired his former home and studio in Princeton, along with two adjacent buildings.

Modernist
Graves spent much of the late 1960s and early 1970s designing modernist residences. Notable examples include the Hanselman House (1967) and the Snyderman House (1972, destroyed by fire in 2002) in Fort Wayne, Indiana. Graves also became one of the New York Five, along with Peter Eisenman, Charles Gwathmey, John Hejduk and Richard Meier. This informal group of Princeton and New York City architects, also known as the Whites due to the predominant color of their architectural work, espoused a pure form of modernism characterized by clean lines and minimal ornamentation. The New York Five became the "standard-bearers of a movement to elevate modernist architectural form into a serious theoretical pursuit." The book, Five Architects (1973) describes some of their early work.

Postmodernist
In the late 1970s, Graves shifted away from modernism to pursue Postmodernism and New Urbanism design for the remainder of his career. He began by sketching designs that had Cubist-inspired elements and strong, saturated colors. Postmodernism allowed Graves to introduce his humanist vision of classicism, as well as his sense of irony and humor. His designs, notable for their "playful style" and "colorful facades," were a "radical departure" from his earlier work. The Plocek Residence (1977), a private home in Warren Township, New Jersey, was among the first of his designs in this new style.

Graves designed some of his most iconic buildings in the early 1980s, including the Portland Building.  The fifteen-story Portland Municipal Services Building, his first major public commission, opened in 1982 in downtown Portland, Oregon.  The "monolithic cube" with decorated facades and colorful, oversized columns is "considered a seminal Postmodern work" and one of Graves's best-known works of architecture. The celebrated but controversial municipal office also became an icon for the city of Portland and subject to an ongoing preservation debate. Regarded as the first major built example of postmodern architecture in a tall office building, the Portland Building was added to the National Register of Historic Places in 2011. Although it faced demolition in 2014, the city government decided to proceed with a renovation, estimated to cost $195 million.

As a result of the notoriety he received from the Portland Building design, Graves was awarded other major commissions in the 1980s and 1990s. Notable buildings from this period include the Humana Building (1982) in Kentucky and the Newark Museum expansion (1982) in New Jersey. Some architecture critics, including Paul Goldberger of The New York Times, consider the Humana Building, a skyscraper in Louisville, Kentucky, one of Graves's finest building designs. TIME magazine also claimed it was a commercial icon for the city of Louisville and one of the best buildings of the 1980s. The San Juan Capistrano Library (1982) in California, another project from this period, shows his interpretation of the Mission Revival style.

Graves and his firm also designed several buildings for the Walt Disney Company in the postmodern style. These include the Team Disney headquarters in Burbank, California; the Dolphin (1987) and Swan (1988) resorts at Walt Disney World in Florida; and Disney's Hotel New York (1989) at Disneyland Paris. Patrick Burke, the project architect for the two resort hotels in Florida, commented that the Walt Disney Company described Graves's designs as "entertainment architecture." In addition to the Swan and Dolphin hotel buildings, Graves's firm designed their original interiors, furnishings, signage, and artwork. Graves's other notable commissions for buildings that were completed in the 1990s include an expansion of the Denver Public Library (1990) and the renovation of the Detroit Institute of Arts (1990).

Postmodern architecture did not have a long-lasting popularity and some of Graves's clients rejected his ideas. For example, his design for an expansion of Marcel Breuer's Whitney Museum of American Art building in New York City in the mid-1980s was highly contested and never built due to architect and local opposition. Graves's designs for a planned Phoenix Municipal Government Center complex were among the project's finalists, but his concept was not selected as the winning entry.

Graves's prominence as a postmodernist architect may have reached its peak during the 1980s and in the early 1990s, but he continued to practice as an architect until his death in 2015. Later works include the O'Reilly Theater (1996) in Pittsburgh, Pennsylvania; the NCAA Hall of Champions in Indianapolis, Indiana; and 425 Fifth Avenue (2000) in New York City, among others. Graves also received recognition for his multi-year renovation of his personal residence in Princeton. International projects included the Sheraton Miramar Hotel (1997) in El Gouna, Egypt, and the Hard Rock Hotel in Singapore. One of the last projects that Michael Graves and Associates was involved in before Graves's death was the Louwman Museum (2010) in The Hague, Netherlands. Gary Lapera, a principal and studio head of Michael Graves and Associates, designed the museum, also known as the Lowman Collection and the National Automobile Museum of the Netherlands, which houses more than 230 cars.

Product and furniture designer
In addition to his architecture, Graves became a noted designer of consumer products. His distinctive style was well known among the general public in the United States in 1980s and 1990s, when he began designing household products for major clients such as the Target Corporation, Alessi, Steuben, and The Walt Disney Company. Over the years, the Michael Graves Design Group, a part of his design firm, designed and brought to market more than 2,000 products.

In the early 1980s Ettore Sottsass recruited Graves to become a member of Memphis, a postmodern design group based in Milan, Italy. Graves began designing consumer products such as furniture and home accessories. Especially notable is his "Plaza" dressing table. Around the same time, Graves became associated with Alessi, a high-end Italian kitchenware manufacturer. Graves designed a sterling silver tea service for Alessi in 1982, a turning point in his career, and he was no longer known solely as an architect. After the $25,000 tea service began to attract buyers, Alberto Alessi commissioned Graves to design a moderate-priced kettle for his company. In 1985 Graves designed his iconic a stainless-steel teakettle (9093 stovetop kettle).

The kettle featured a red, bird-shaped whistle at the end of the spout. It remained the company's top-selling product for fifteen years. In honor of its thirtieth anniversary in 2015, Graves designed a special edition version with a dragon replacing the kettle's bird-shaped whistle.
In Italy in 1987, clock on display Apollodoro Gallery, seventh event The Hour of Architects, with Hans Hollei, Arata Isozaki, Ettore Sottsass, Paolo Portoghesi, paintings by Paolo Salvati, Rome.
In 1997–98, when Graves designed the scaffolding used in the restoration of the Washington Monument in Washington D.C., he met Ron Johnson, a Target executive who appreciated his product designs. (The Target Corporation contributed $6 million toward restoration of the monument.) The result of their acquaintance was the formation of a business relationship between Graves and the U.S. retailer that lasted until 2012. Graves began the collaboration with Target by designing a half-dozen products for the mass-consumer market. His collection of housewares began selling in Target stores in January 1999.

In 1998, Target commissioned Graves to design a model home to showcase the new line of housewares, but Graves went a step further. He designed "Cedar Gables," contemporary house in Minnetonka, Minnesota, complete with custom furniture, lighting, fixtures, and other unique items, making it only one of three homes he designed and furnished. By 2009, however, Graves noted that the house "doesn't have a wow factor. That gets old quickly." 
When the partnership with Target ended in 2012, Graves had designed more than 500 objects for the retailer.

Increasingly concerned about Target's dwindling partnerships with outside designers, Graves decided to explore other relationships for marketing his consumer products. After Johnson became CEO of J.C. Penney in 2011, he and Graves reached an agreement for Graves to design products exclusively for Penney's. Graves also created products for other manufacturers. In the 1990s for example, Graves created the Mickey Mouse Gourmet Collection for Moeller Design with the Walt Disney Company's approval. The collection of kitchenware and tabletop items was initially sold through the Walt Disney Company's retail stores and later offered at other retail outlets.

In 2013, Graves designed what became known as the “Hitler teapot” for department store JCPenney, which garnered controversy due to its perceived resemblance to Adolf Hitler.

In addition to housewares, Graves was involved in a variety of other design projects that included sets and costumes for New York City's Joffrey Ballet; a shopping bag for Bloomingdale's department store; jewelry for Cleto Munari of Milan, Italy; vinyl flooring for Tajima, a Japanese company; and rugs for Vorwerk, a German firm. In 1994 Graves opened a small retail store named the Graves Design Store in Princeton, New Jersey, where shoppers could purchase his designs and reproductions of his artwork. At that time Graves had designed products for more than fifty manufacturers.

Later years

Graves retired as a professor of architecture at Princeton University in 2001, but remained active in his architecture and design firm. He also became an advocate for the disabled in the last decade of his life. When Graves became paralyzed from the waist down in 2003, the result of a spinal cord infection, the use of a wheelchair heightened his awareness of the needs of the disabled. After weeks of hospitalization and physical therapy, Graves adapted his home to suit his accessibility needs and resumed his architectural and design work. In addition to other types of buildings and household products, Graves designed wheelchairs, hospital furnishings, hospitals, and disabled veteran's housing. Graves also became a "reluctant health expert", as well as an internationally recognized advocate for accessible design. In 2013, President Barack Obama appointed Graves to an administrative role in the Architectural and Transportation Barriers Compliance Board (also known as the Access Board). The independent agency addresses accessibility concerns for people with disabilities.

In 2014, a year before his death, Graves helped to establish and plan the Michael Graves College, which includes The School of Public Architecture at Kean University in Union, New Jersey. Kean University's Bachelor of Arts in Architectural Studies program began in 2015; its Master of Architecture program is slated to begin in 2019. As part of gift from Graves's estate, in 2016 the university acquired "The Warehouse" at 44 Patton Avenue in Princeton — Graves's former home and studio — as well as two adjacent buildings. The university plans to use the facility as an educational research center for its School of Public Architecture, although its main campus and its School of Public Architecture are located about forty miles away in Union, New Jersey.

Death and legacy
Graves died at his home in Princeton, New Jersey, on March 12, 2015, at the age of 80, and is buried at Princeton Cemetery.

Graves favored a "humanistic approach to architecture and urban planning" and was a major influence in late-twentieth-century architecture. Graves was among the most prolific and prominent American architects from the mid-1960s to the end of the twentieth century. Graves and his team designed more than 350 buildings in the Postmodern, New Classical, and New Urbanism styles for projects around the world. His architectural designs have been recognized as major influences in all three of these movements.

In naming Graves as a recipient of its national design award for lifetime achievement, the Cooper Hewitt, Smithsonian Design Museum explained that Graves broadened "the role of the architect in society" and raised "public interest in good design as essential to the quality of everyday life." Graves and his firm designed more than 2,000 consumer products during his lifetime. He was especially noted for his domestic housewares. Many Graves-designed products were sold through mass-market U.S. retailers such as Target and J. C. Penney, but his best-known product is the iconic kettle that he designed in 1985 for Alessi, an Italian housewares manufacturer. As an advocate for the needs of the disabled, Graves used his skills as an architect and designer "to improve healthcare experience for patients, families and clinicians."

Awards and honors
 In 1979 Graves was elected a Fellow of the American Institute of Architects. 
 Graves served as a trustee of the American Academy in Rome and was the president of its Society of Fellows from 1980 to 1984.
 In 1986 Graves received the Golden Plate Award of the American Academy of Achievement.
 In 1994 he was awarded the American Prize for Architecture
 President Bill Clinton awarded Graves the National Medal of Arts in 1999. 
 Graves was voted GQ'''s Man of the Year in 1999.
 Graves was awarded the American Institute of Architects' AIA Gold Medal in 2001. His career was also recognized with an AIA Presidential Citation and the Topaz Medallion from the AIA/ACSA. 
 Graves was the first recipient of the Michael Graves Lifetime Achievement Award from the AIA-NJ.
 Graves received honorary degrees from the University of Miami in 2001.
 In 2002 the Indiana Historical Society named Graves as an Indiana Living Legend.
 In 2009 Graves was named a Design Futures Council Senior Fellow, one of the twelve honorees selected that year.
 In 2010 Graves was inducted into the New Jersey Hall of Fame.
 The Center for Health Design and Healthcare Design'' magazine recognized Graves as one of the top twenty-five "most influential people in healthcare design" in 2010.
 Graves was named the Driehaus Architecture Prize in 2012. 
 Graves was awarded an honorary degree from Emory University in 2013. 
 From October 13, 2014, to April 5, 2015, in honor of the fiftieth anniversary of Graves's firm, Michael Graves Architecture and Design, the Grounds for Sculpture in Hamilton, New Jersey, held a retrospective exhibition, "Michael Graves: Past as Prologue."
 On November 22, 2014, the Architectural League of New York held a daylong symposium in his honor at the Parsons School of Design. Several prominent architects such as Steven Holl and Peter Eisenman, as well as Graves served as guests and lecturers.
 In 2015 the Cooper Hewitt Smithsonian Design Museum posthumously awarded Graves a National Design Award for Lifetime Achievement.

Works

 Hanselmann House, Fort Wayne, Indiana, 1968
 Benacerraf House, Princeton, New Jersey, 1969
 Snyderman House, Fort Wayne, Indiana, 1972
 Wageman House, Princeton, New Jersey, 1974
 Fargo-Moorhead Cultural Center Bridge, Fargo, North Dakota, 1977
 Plocek Residence, Warren, New Jersey, 1977 (Graves' first postmodern design)
 Roma Interrotta Exhibition, Rome, Italy, 1978
 Portland Building, Portland, Oregon, 1982
 Humana Building, Louisville, Kentucky, 1982
 Newark Museum expansion, Newark, New Jersey, 1982
 San Juan Capistrano Library, San Juan Capistrano, California, 1982
 Riverbend Music Center, Cincinnati, Ohio, 1984
 Aventine Mixed Use Development, La Jolla, California, 1985
 Crown American Building, Johnstown, Pennsylvania, 1986
 Team Disney headquarters building, Burbank, California, 1986
 Graves Residence ("The Warehouse"), Princeton, New Jersey, 1986
 Shiseido Health Club, Tokyo, Japan, 1986
 Clos Pegase Winery, Calistoga, California, 1987
 Bryan Hall, University of Virginia, Charlottesville, Virginia, 1987
 Dolphin Resort, Walt Disney World, Orlando, Florida, 1987
 Swan Resort, Walt Disney World, Orlando, Florida, 1987
 Metropolis master plan, Los Angeles, California, 1988
 Tajima Office Building, Tokyo, Japan, 1988
 Disney's Hotel New York, Euro Disney Resort (now Disneyland Paris), Marne-la-Vallée, France, 1989
Ten Peachtree Place, Atlanta, Georgia, 1989
 Clark County Library and Theater, Las Vegas, Nevada, 1990
 Dairy Barn renovation, Harbourton, New Jersey, 1990
 Denver Public Library, Denver, Colorado, 1990
 Detroit Institute of Arts master plan, Detroit, Michigan, 1990
 Fukuoka Hyatt Hotel and Office Building, Fukuoka, Japan, 1990
 Kasumi Research and Training Center, Tsukaba, Japan, 1990
 Kavli Institute for Theoretical Physics, University of California, Santa Barbara, California, 1990
 Malibu House (private residence), Malibu, California, 1990
 Onjuku Town Hall, Onjuku, Japan, 1990
 Engineering Center, University of Cincinnati College of Engineering, Cincinnati, Ohio, 1990
 Youngstown Historical Center of Industry and Labor, Youngstown, Ohio, 1990
 Arts and Sciences Building, Stockton University, Pomona, New Jersey, 1991
 Thomson Consumer Electronics Americas headquarters, Indianapolis, Indiana, 1992
 U.S. Courthouse renovation, Trenton, New Jersey, 1992
 Astrid Park Plaza Hotel and Business Center, Antwerp, Belgium, 1993
 International Finance Corporation Headquarters of the World Bank, Washington, D.C., 1993
 Michael C. Carlos Museum, Emory University, Atlanta, Georgia, 1993
 Ministry of Health, Welfare and Sport, The Hague, Netherlands, 1993
 Nexus Momochi Residential Tower, Fukuoka, Japan, 1993
 Archdiocesan Center, Newark, New Jersey, 1993
 Rome Reborn Exhibition, Washington, D.C., 1993
 U.S. Post Office, Celebration, Florida, 1993
 1500 Ocean Drive, Miami Beach, Florida, 1994
 Ocean Steps Retail Center with 1500 Ocean Drive, Miami Beach, Florida, 1994
 One Port Center (Delaware River Port Authority headquarters), Camden, New Jersey, 1994
 Pura-Williams House, Manchester-by-the-Sea, Massachusetts, 1994
 Miramar Resort Hotel, El Gouna, Egypt, 1995
 Topeka & Shawnee County Public Library, Topeka, Kansas, 1995
 The Engineering Research Center, University of Cincinnati, Cincinnati, Ohio, 1995
 Rare Books Library, American Academy, Rome, Italy, 1996
 Charles E. Beatley Jr. Central Library, Alexandria, Virginia, 1996
 House At Indian Hill, Cincinnati, Ohio, 1996
 Indianapolis Art Center, Indianapolis, Indiana, 1996
 Lake Hills Country Club, Seoul, Korea, 1996
 Miele Americas Headquarters, Princeton, New Jersey, 1996
 O'Reilly Theater, Pittsburgh, Pennsylvania, 1996
 French Institute⁄Alliance Française Library, New York, New York, 1997
 De Luwte House, Loenen aan de Vecht, Netherlands, 1997
 North Hall Residence, Drexel University, Philadelphia, Pennsylvania, 1997
 El Gouna Golf Club, El Gouna, Egypt, 1997
 El Gouna Golf Hotel, El Gouna, Egypt, 1997
 El Gouna Golf Villas, El Gouna, Egypt, 1997
 Fortis/AG Headquarters, Brussels, Belgium, 1997
 Fukuoka Office Building, Fukuoka, Japan, 1997
 Hyatt Hotel Taba Heights, Taba Heights, Egypt, 1997
 Intercontinental Hotel, Taba Heights, Egypt, 1997
 Laurel Hall, New Jersey Institute of Technology, Newark, New Jersey, 1997
 NCAA Hall of Champions and headquarters, Indianapolis, Indiana, 1997
 U.S. Courthouse, Washington, D.C., 1997
 Bristol/Savoy Towers (Ten Good City), Fukuoka, Japan, 1998
 Cedar Gables House, Minneapolis, Minnesota, 1998
 Impala Building, New York, New York, 1998
 Castalia Building (Ministry of Public Health), The Hague, Netherlands, 1998
 Saint Martin's College Library, Lacey, Washington, 1998
 Master plan, New Jersey Institute of Technology, Newark, New Jersey, 1999
 Laurel Hall expansion, New Jersey Institute of Technology, Newark, New Jersey, 1999
 Philadelphia Eagles/Novacare Training Center, Philadelphia, Pennsylvania, 1999
 Pittsburgh Cultural District Service Center, Pittsburgh, Pennsylvania, 1999
 Private residence, Harbourton, New Jersey, 1999
 Martel, Brown and Jones Colleges at Rice University, Houston, Texas, 1999
 Singapore National Library Competition, Singapore, 1999
 Target House Fountain, Memphis, Tennessee, 1999
 Washington Monument scaffolding, Washington, D.C., 1999
 Watch Technicum, Lancaster County, Pennsylvania, 1999
 425 Fifth Avenue, New York, New York, 2000
 Capital Regional Medical Center, Tallahassee Community Hospital, Tallahassee, Florida, 2000
 Famille Tsukishima Apartment Building, Tokyo, Japan, 2000
 Federal Reserve Bank of Dallas Houston Branch, Houston, Texas, 2000
 Hart Production Studios, San Francisco, California, 2000
 Newark Museum Science Gallery, Newark, New Jersey, 2000
 Perseus Office, Washington, D.C., 2000
 Private residence, Lake Geneva, Switzerland, 2000
 U.S. Embassy Compound (embassy and housing), Seoul, South Korea, 2000
 Children's Theatre Company, Minneapolis, Minnesota, 2001
 Fukuoka Office Building, Fukuoka, Japan, 2001
 Kasteel Holterveste, De Haverleij, Netherlands, 2001
 Mahler 4, Amsterdam, Netherlands, 2001
 Michael C. Carlos Museum renovation, Emory University, Atlanta, Georgia, 2001
 Three On The Bund, Shanghai, China, 2001
 Arts Council of Princeton, Princeton, New Jersey, 2002
 U.S. Department of Transportation headquarters, Washington, D.C., 2002
 Kavli Institute for Theoretical Physics/Kohn Hall, University of California, Santa Barbara, California, 2002
 National Museum of Prehistory, Taitung, Taiwan, 2002
 Arts and Science Building, New Jersey City University, Jersey City, New Jersey, 2002
 New Jersey State Police Training Center and headquarters, Trenton, New Jersey, 2002
 Resort master plan, Canary Islands, Spain, 2002
 South Campus master plan, Rice University, Houston, Texas, 2002
 Saint Mary's Catholic Church, Rockledge, Florida, 2002.
 Target Club Wedd House contest prize, 2002
 Campus master plan, Florida Institute of Technology Melbourne, Florida, 2003
 Sigma Chi fraternity house, George Washington University, Washington, D.C., 2003
 Housing For Martin House, Trenton, New Jersey, 2003
 The Pinnacle and 260 Main Street, White Plains, New York, 2003
 U.S. Courthouse, Nashville, Tennessee, 2003
 Alter Hall, Fox School of Business, Temple University, Philadelphia, Pennsylvania, 2004
 Indianapolis Art Center master plan, Indianapolis, Indiana, 2004
 Maxwell Place On The Hudson, Interiors Block A, Hoboken, New Jersey, 2004
 Chancellor Green Interiors, Princeton University, Princeton, New Jersey, 2004
 Riverwalk 2, Nishinippon Institute of Technology Design School, Kitakyushu, Japan, 2004
 Trump International Hotel, Fort Lauderdale, Florida, 2004
 School Of Business, University of Miami, Miami, Florida, 2004
 701 E. Baltimore, Baltimore, Maryland, 2005
 Azulera Resort Hotel and Residences, Brasilito Bay Guanacaste, Costa Rica, 2005
 Burj Dubai Towers, Dubai, United Arab Emirates, 2005
 The Enclave Residential Condominiums, Puerto Vallarta, Mexico, 2005
 College Of Psychology and Autism, Florida Institute of Technology, Melbourne, Florida, 2005
 Hyatt Hotel, Beirut, Lebanon, 2005
 Luxury Condominium Towers, Beirut, Lebanon, 2005
 Maxwell Place On The Hudson, Interiors Block B, Hoboken, New Jersey, 2005
 Museum of the Shenandoah Valley, Winchester, Virginia, 2005
 Paterson Public Schools complex, Paterson, New Jersey, 2005
 Riverside Park residential development master plan, Fairfax County, Virginia, 2005
 Springhill Lake master plan, Greenbelt, Maryland, 2005
 Storehouse prototype retail store, West Palm Beach, Florida, 2005
 Allegria Residence, 6th of October City, Egypt, 2006
 The Falls at Lake Travis community master plan, Austin, Texas, 2006
 Four Seasons Residence at Town Lake, Austin, Texas, 2006
 Minneapolis Institute of Arts expansion, Minneapolis, Minnesota, 2006
 Notre Dame Club, University of Notre Dame, South Bend, Indiana, 2006
 Private residence, Sentosa, Singapore, 2006
 St. Regis Hotels & Resorts Cairo, Cairo, Egypt, 2006
 Shake-a-Leg Residences, Miami, Florida, 2006
 Saint Coletta of Greater Washington, Washington, D.C., 2006
 Wyndham Hotel prototypes, 2006
 School of Nursing, Columbia University, New York, New York, 2007
 Community master plan, New Cairo, Egypt, 2007
 Detroit Institute of Arts major renovation and expansion, Detroit, Michigan, 2007
 MarketFair Retail Center, Princeton, New Jersey, 2007
 Equestrian City Tower, Riyadh, Saudi Arabia, 2008
 Paul Robeson Center for the Arts, Arts Council of Princeton, Princeton, New Jersey, 2008
 Mitchell Institute for Fundamental Physics and Astronomy and Department of Physics Building, Texas A&M University, College Station, Texas, 2009
 Alter Hall, Fox School of Business, Temple University, Philadelphia, Pennsylvania, 2009
 Wu-Wilcox Halls additions and interiors, Princeton University, Princeton, New Jersey, 2006
 Resorts World at Sentosa, Singapore, 2010
 Louwman Museum (National Automobile Museum), The Hague, Netherlands, 2010
 PS/IS 42, Arverne, New York, 2012

References

Further reading
 
  (reprint edition)

External links 

 
 The Michael Graves Contract Fabric Collection, CF Stinson, Inc.
 
 , Notre Dame School of Architecture
 "AD Interviews: Michael Graves", ArchDaily
 Washington Monument scaffolding

 
1934 births
2015 deaths
Fellows of the American Institute of Architects
American industrial designers
Dinnerware designers
Postmodern architects
Architects from Indianapolis
Members of the American Academy of Arts and Letters
United States National Medal of Arts recipients
University of Cincinnati alumni
Harvard Graduate School of Design alumni
Princeton University faculty
New Classical architects
Driehaus Architecture Prize winners
21st-century American architects
20th-century American architects
Burials at Princeton Cemetery
Recipients of the AIA Gold Medal